Augusto Ibáñez Sacristán is a Basque pelota forward player. Champion of the Doubles Hand-pelota tournaments of 1994, 2000, 2004 and 2012.

Professional career
Titín III made his professional debut on September 13, 1992, on the Barberito I fronton, from Baños de Río Tobía, losing the game along with Maiz II to Bengoetxea IV and Berna for a final score of 22-21.
In 1994 along with Arretxe won his first Doubles Hand-pelota Championship, and repeated the title again in 2000 and 2004 with different partners on the defense. On December 2, 2007, won the Cuatro y Medio championship after defeating Abel Barriola in the final for 22-15 on the Ogueta fronton in Vitoria. On February 10, 2008, a sculpture of his hand along with a gigantography of him on the hitting wall were inaugurated on Adarraga fronton in Logroño. On March 30, 2008, loss the final of the doubles championship along with Laskurain, to Olaizola II and Mendizábal II for 22-17.

Personal life
Titín III's nephew Víctor López is a footballer.

Cuatro y Medio Championship finals

Hand-pelota doubles championship finals

Sources

External links
 Titín III bio at ASPE

Spanish pelotaris
Pelotaris from La Rioja
1969 births
Living people
People from Nájera